Ralf Volker Sander (born 15 December 1963) is an international active sculptor. His best
known works include Lady Bird Transformation(mirage), a public sculpture for Busan Cinema Center, South Korea, commissioned in 2011 and erected in August 2012. The memorial for Martin Heinrich Klaproth
was erected on the campus of Technische Universität Berlin, 25 June 1996.


Early life 

Born in West Berlin, Sander grew up in the British sector. He studied fine art and the history of art
at Berlin University of the Arts, from 1986 to 1988. After the death of his Stepfather, Klaus Komoll,
who left him a small sailing vessel, he was able to circumnavigate the world between 1988 and 1990 in order to
study the tribal art of the pacific islands and Papua New Guinea. He completed his studies with
a postgraduate course in sculpture at the Berlin University of the Arts, between 1991 and 1994. He
travelled to China and Japan with a DAAD grant to study Asian Art and philosophy between 1992 and 1994.

Career

Almost all of his early works took the human body as its subject and base for human scale wooden sculptures and carvings made from a single log of wood. Sander describes his work as: "encounter with the other side of appearance".  His work attempts to treat the body not as an object but a common condition. Since 2000 he experiments with different materials and media, including film. He repeatedly refers in his work on whole social groups and integrates their participation into the working process, (as in:Rolandtransfer, Child's play, Lernen ist sich Oeffnen) relying on Joseph Beuys term Soziale Plastik. In 2003 and 2004, Ralf Sander became visiting Professor at Academy of Fine Arts in Warsaw, Poland.
The annual exhibition Aquamediale was curated and initiated together with Sieghard Auer in 2005.
In the same year, he was also appointed Reader at University of Ulster in Belfast, Northern Ireland. From 2008 to 2012, Ralf Sander worked as professor for sculpture at Seoul National University, South Korea.
In 2008, he started the World Saving Machine cycle, a visionary project and inquiry of the impact of science on wider cultural contexts. World Saving Machine I and III are part of the WSM-Project. Both focus on transformation of solar energy into ice– literally, as well as (on a larger scale) metaphorically. World Saving Machine 2 transforms carbon dioxide into oxygen.
The project was continued in collaboration with KAIST (Korea Advanced Institute of Science and Technology) University, Daedeok, Korea. In 2010, he became member of the commission board for Expo 2012 in Yeosu, South Korea.
One year later, Sander won the international art commission for the Busan Cinema Center. The iconic building is designed by Wolf Prix- Coop Himmelb(l)au, as host of the Busan International Film Festival, Asia's largest film festival. The 10.20m stainless steel sculpture, Lady Bird Transformation, morphs from a striding woman into a sea gull in flight, depending on the angle from which it is viewed.

Major works

 Klaproth Stele (1996) – TU Berlin
 Beuys (1996) – Robert Bosch Stiftung, Stuttgart, Germany
 St Dominicus (1999) – St Bonifaz, Mainz, Germany
 Cube (2001) – Lubben, Brandenburg, Germany
 Mensch aergere Dich nicht (2003)
 Childs Play (2005)
 Rolandtransfer (2006) – permanently installed at Hohenstuecken near Brandenburg, Germany
 World Saving Machine (since 2008) – Crane Art Center, Kaist University, Philadelphia, United States, 
 Korean Energy (2011) – acquired by Seoul MoA, Korea University
 Lady Bird Transformation (Mirage, 2012) Busan Film Center, South Korea
 Belfast Seahorse (2013) – at Belfast Harbour, Belfast, Northern Ireland

References

External links
 http://www.ralfsander.com
 World Saving Machine https://web.archive.org/web/20130624234614/http://worldsavingmachine.com/
 http://www.poland-art.com/index.php/wystawy/krakow/galeria-as/6453-ralf-sander
 http://www.dziennikpolski24.pl/pl/aktualnosci/kultura/1235738-plac-zabaw-dla-doroslych-zbudowany-w-cieniu-wojny-tortur-niesprawiedliwosci.html
 https://web.archive.org/web/20130624234614/http://worldsavingmachine.com/
 Sanders's exhibition in Kraków, Poland for the Identity in Global Crisis project https://archive.today/20130416091935/http://asgallery.home.pl/wydarzenia/i-am-you-ralf-sander-play-salon-for-adults-barbara-zambrzycka-sliwa/
 Pictures of Sanders's sculpture in Busan, being erected on 27 August 2012 https://archive.today/20130410044657/http://ajumaalive.com/2012/10/26/busan-cinema-center/
 An interview with Sander by Ian Todd, Culturenorthernireland https://web.archive.org/web/20130607013643/http://www.culturenorthernireland.org/article.aspx?art_id=4962
  Interview about World Saving Machine at SNU http://thesnuquill.blogspot.co.uk/2009/04/vol19-sculptor-ralph-sander-as-educator.html
 Sanders's artwork World Saving Machine, Kaist University, South Korea Crane Art Center, Philadelphia,USA by Kim Hyung Soon http://blog.daum.net/_blog/BlogTypeView.do?blogid=0YTwp&articleno=166&admin=#ajax_history_home
 Sanders's artwork World Saving Machine2 at Crane Art Center, Philadelphia,USA http://thegraphicconscience.blogspot.co.uk/2008/11/globarl-warming-at-icebox-curator.html

German sculptors
German male sculptors
Living people
1963 births